is a passenger railway station located in the town of Matsuda, Kanagawa, Japan, operated by the private railway operator Odakyu Electric Railway. Matsuda Station on the Gotemba Line operated by Central Japan Railway Company (JR Central) is located nearby.

Lines
The station is 71.8 km from the line's Tokyo terminal at Shinjuku.

Station layout
Shin-Matsuda Station has two island platforms serving four tracks.

Platforms

 Note that some express services stop at all stations between Shin-Matsuda and Odawara.

History
Shin-Matsuda Station opened on 1 April 1927. The current station building dates from March 1980, with the former station building relocated to the Mukogaoka Amusement Park for use as a railway museum.

Station numbering was introduced in January 2014 with Shin-Matsuda being assigned station number OH41.

Passenger statistics
In fiscal 2019, the station was used by an average of 22,946 passengers daily (boarding passengers only).

The passenger figures (boarding passengers only) for previous years are as shown below.

Bus services
 Hakone Tozan Bus
 for Sekimoto (Daiyuzan Station) via Kaisei Town
 for Jizodo via Sekimoto (Daiyuzan Station) and Yagurasawa
 Fujikyu Shonan Bus
 for Nishi Tanzawa via JR Yamakita Station, JR Yaga Station, Lake Tanzawa (Kurokura and Nakagawa onsen)
 for Asahi Breweries Kanagawa Brewery
 for Yadoriki

Surrounding area
Kanagawa Prefectural Ashigarakami Hospital
Matsuda Town Hall
Matsuda Town Cultural Center
 Matsuda Town Gymnasium

See also
List of railway stations in Japan

References

External links

 Shin-Matsuda Station information 
 Transfer & Fare search (Odakyu) 

Odakyu Odawara Line
Railway stations in Kanagawa Prefecture
Railway stations in Japan opened in 1927
Matsuda, Kanagawa